What Silence Knows is the debut solo album by English singer Shara Nelson, released in September 1993 on Cooltempo Records. It includes five singles which reached the UK Singles Chart: "Down That Road", "One Goodbye in Ten", "Inside Out", "Uptight" and "Nobody". The album peaked at No. 22 on the UK Albums Chart and was later certified Gold by the British Phonographic Industry for sales in excess of 100,000 copies.

The album was shortlisted for the 1994 Mercury Music Prize.

Critical reception 
Alan Jones from Music Week wrote, "A glittering solo debut for this talented vocalist. The current single, "One Goodbye in Ten", is particularly fine: a
rich string arrangement underpinning a Sixties feel. Other tracks, such as "Nobody", recall her past with Massive Attack, while the vox/piano style of "Inside Out" has a haunting, stark beauty. Could be a Dina Carroll-style breakout."

Track listing 

 "Nobody" (Shara Nelson, Kenny Nicholas, Trevor Jacobs, Suni Suleynan) – 4:22
 "Pain Revisited" (Shara Nelson, Howie Bernstein) – 5:16
 "One Goodbye in Ten" (Shara Nelson, Bob Stanley, Pete Wiggs) – 5:50
 "Inside Out" (Shara Nelson, Kevin Armstrong) – 3:19
 "Uptight" (Shara Nelson, Prince Be) – 5:04
 "Down That Road" (Shara Nelson, Prince Be) – 5:15
 "Chance" (Shara Nelson, Kenny Nicholas, Trevor Jacobs, Suni Suleynan) – 3:58
 "Thoughts of You" (Shara Nelson, John Coxon) – 4:16
 "How Close" (Shara Nelson, Prince Be) – 3:59
 "What Silence Knows" (Shara Nelson, Style Scott) – 6:59

Personnel 
Shara Nelson – vocals
Billy Liesegang, G.A. Parricelli – guitar
Mike Peden – bass
Mel Wesson – keyboards, synthesizer
Michael Timothy, Pete Wingfield – keyboards
Rupert Brown, Trevor Murrell – drums
Miles Bould – percussion
Lyn Gerald, Tee Green – backing vocals
Philip D. Todd – flute, electronic wind instrument
London Session Orchestra – strings
Nick Ingman – string arrangements
Gavyn Wright – orchestral leader and conductor

Charts

Album

Singles

References

External links 

1993 debut albums
Shara Nelson albums
Cooltempo Records albums
Albums produced by Mike Peden